Sri Lanka Technological Campus (also known as SLT Campus or SLTC) is a private university in Sri Lanka. It conducts Engineering programs in Electronics, Telecommunications, Power Systems and Computing. Its degree programs are accredited by the Ministry of Higher Education and Highways and recognized by the university grants commission (UGC).

History
Founded in 2015, as a subsidiary of Sri Lanka Telecom, its main campus is located at the 36 acre former Satellite Station premises in Padukka. SLT Campus's School of Professional Studies is located at the TRACE Expert City in Colombo. It is the first corporate funded, fully residential private research university in Sri Lanka. Through Sri Lanka Telecom, it came under the Ministry of Telecommunication and Digital Infrastructure. 

In 2017, it was recognized as a degree-awarding institution by the Ministry of Higher Education and Highways, with a gazette notification indicating it could grant BSc Engineering degrees in the fields of power, electronic, ICT and telecommunication engineering.

In 2021 SLT divested its ownership and sold the university to Tempest Two Ltd a joint venture between Capital Alliance and Insite Holdings.

Faculties
 Faculty of Engineering 
 Faculty of Technology
 Faculty of Professional Studies
 Faculty of Business and Management
 Faculty of IT & Computing
 Faculty of Music
 Faculty of Graduate Studies

See also 
SLTMobitel
List of universities in Sri Lanka
Research in Sri Lanka
Arthur C. Clarke Institute for Modern Technologies

References

External links
Sri Lanka Technological Campus website

Educational institutions established in 2015
Universities and colleges in Colombo District
Engineering universities and colleges in Sri Lanka
2015 establishments in Sri Lanka
Universities in Sri Lanka